Saint-Martin-de-Laye is a commune in the Gironde department in Nouvelle-Aquitaine in southwestern France. Saint-Martin-de-Laye is also the birthplace of Élie, duc Decazes.

Population

See also
Communes of the Gironde department

References

Communes of Gironde